Blood for the Blood God is the seventh studio album by Irish Celtic metal band Cruachan. It was released in 2014 on Trollzorn Records.

Track listing

Personnel
Keith Fay - vocals, guitars, acoustic guitar, keyboards, piano, bouzouki, mandolin, bodhrán, percussion
Kieran Ball - guitars, acoustic guitar
Erin Fletcher - bass guitar
Mauro Frison - drums, percussion
John Ryan - violin, cello, bowed bass
John Fay - tin whistle, low whistle, percussion, artwork

 Additional personnel
Barbara Allen - vocals
Alex Shkuroparsky - Galician bagpipe
Karen Gilligan - vocals on "The Voyage of Bran" (demo)
Peter Rees - artwork
Michael Richards - producer, recording

References

Cruachan (band) albums
2014 albums
Irish-language albums
Trollzorn Records albums